Natalia Poluyanova (born March 11, 1981, Belgorod, Belgorod Oblast) is a Russian political figure and a deputy of the 8th State Duma. 

Poluyanova started her political career in 2003 when she became the chief specialist of the Belgorod branch of the United Russia. From 2006 to 2010, she worked as the head of the youth policy department of the department of education, culture, sports and youth policy of the administration of Belgorod. On October 10, 2010, she was elected deputy of the Belgorod Oblast Duma. In 2014-2016, she headed the Korochansky District. In September 2019, Poluyanova became the chairman of the Belgorod Oblast Duma. Since September 2021, she has served as deputy of the 8th State Duma.

She is one of the members of the State Duma the United States Treasury sanctioned on 24 March 2022 in response to the 2022 Russian invasion of Ukraine.

References

1964 births
Living people
United Russia politicians
21st-century Russian politicians
Eighth convocation members of the State Duma (Russian Federation)
21st-century Russian women politicians
People from Belgorod
Belgorod Technological University alumni
Russian individuals subject to the U.S. Department of the Treasury sanctions
Russian Presidential Academy of National Economy and Public Administration alumni